is a passenger railway station  located in the city of   Nishinomiya Hyōgo Prefecture, Japan. It is operated by the private transportation company Hankyu Railway.

Lines

Station layout
The station consists of two side platforms serving two tracks on the otherwise single-track line. Access between the platforms is via an underground passageway.

Adjacent stations

History
The station opened on 8 March 1925.

Passenger statistics
In fiscal 2019, the station was used by an average of 7,532 passengers daily

Surrounding area
Kurakuen - One of Nishinomiya's seven gardens and a luxury residential area.
Shukugawa - The Nakaniida River merges on the south side of the station.
Shukugawa Park
Nishinomiya Municipal Kitashukugawa Elementary School

See also
List of railway stations in Japan

References

External links

 Kurakuenguchi Station website 

Railway stations in Hyōgo Prefecture
Railway stations in Japan opened in 1925
Nishinomiya